Adelaide Chiozzo (8 May 1931 – 4 March 2020) was a Brazilian actress, accordionist and singer who appeared on the radio and in many chanchada films. She was known for her cover version of songs like "Beijinho Doce" and "Sabiá na Gaiola".

Chiozzo died on 4 March 2020 in a hospital in Rio de Janeiro, after suffering a fall at her home, aged 88.

Filmography

Film

Television

References

External links

 

1931 births
2020 deaths
Brazilian people of Italian descent
20th-century Brazilian women singers
20th-century Brazilian singers
21st-century Brazilian women singers
21st-century Brazilian singers
20th-century Brazilian actresses
21st-century Brazilian actresses
Brazilian film actresses
Brazilian accordionists
Women accordionists